Capital punishment is a legal penalty under the criminal justice system of the United States federal government. It can be imposed for treason, espionage, murder, large-scale drug trafficking, or attempted murder of a witness, juror, or court officer in certain cases.

The federal government imposes and carries out a small minority of the death sentences in the U.S., with the vast majority being applied by state governments. The Federal Bureau of Prisons (BOP) manages the housing and execution of federal death row prisoners.

In practice, the federal government rarely carries out executions. As a result of the Supreme Court opinion in Furman v. Georgia in 1972, the federal death penalty was suspended from law until its reinstatement by Congress in 1988. No federal executions occurred between 1972 and 2001. From 2001 to 2003, three people were executed by the federal government. No further federal executions occurred from March 18, 2003, up to July 14, 2020, when they resumed under President Donald Trump, during which 13 death row inmates were executed in the last 6 months of his presidency. Since January 16, 2021 no further executions have been performed. On July 1, 2021, U.S. Attorney General Merrick Garland placed a moratorium on all federal executions pending review of policy and procedures. There are 44 offenders remaining on federal death row.

History

The Crimes Act of 1790 defined some capital offenses: treason, murder, robbery, piracy, mutiny, hostility against the United States, counterfeiting, and aiding the escape of a capital prisoner. The first federal execution was that of Thomas Bird on June 25, 1790, due to his committing "murder on the high seas".

The use of the death penalty in U.S. territories was handled by federal judges and the U.S. Marshal Service.

Historically, members of the U.S. Marshals Service conducted all federal executions. Pre-Furman executions by the federal government were normally carried out within the prison system of the state in which the crime was committed. Only in cases where the crime was committed in a territory, the District of Columbia, or a state without the death penalty was it the norm for the court to designate the state in which the death penalty would be carried out, as the federal prison system did not have an execution facility.

The last pre-Furman federal execution took place on March 15, 1963, when Victor Feguer was executed for kidnapping and murder, after President John F. Kennedy denied clemency.

Capital punishment was halted in 1972 after the Furman v. Georgia decision but was once again permitted under the Gregg v. Georgia decision in 1976.

In the late 1980s, Senator Alfonse D'Amato, from New York State, sponsored a bill to make certain federal drug crimes eligible for the death penalty as he was frustrated by the lack of a death penalty in his home state. The Anti-Drug Abuse Act of 1988 restored the death penalty under federal law for drug offenses and some types of murder. President Bill Clinton signed the Violent Crime Control and Law Enforcement Act, expanding the federal death penalty in 1994. In response to the Oklahoma City bombing, the Antiterrorism and Effective Death Penalty Act of 1996 was passed in 1996. Federal Correctional Complex, Terre Haute became the only federal prison to execute people and one of only three prisons to hold federally condemned people.

The federal death penalty applies even in areas without a state death penalty since federal criminal law is the same for the entire country and is enforced by federal courts, rather than by state courts. From 1988 to October 2019, federal juries gave death sentences to eight convicts in places without a state death penalty when the crime was committed and tried.

The federal death penalty is also applicable for any crime involving the killing of a United States national even if such killing occurred outside of the United States.

Timothy McVeigh was executed on June 11, 2001, for his involvement in the Oklahoma City bombing, where 168 people were killed. The first federal execution since 1963, it was broadcast on a closed circuit-television to survivors and victims' families.

Most of the federal death row inmates are imprisoned at Federal Correctional Complex in Terre Haute, Indiana. , aside from those at Terre Haute, two male death row inmates, Dzhokhar Tsarnaev and Kaboni Savage, are held at ADX Florence. Three people have had their sentences commuted to life in prison: one by President Bill Clinton in 2001, and two in 2017 by President Barack Obama, who commuted one death sentence handed down by a federal district court and another issued by a court-martial.

Since 2019
On July 25, 2019, U.S. Attorney General William Barr announced that the federal government would resume executions using pentobarbital, rather than the three-drug cocktail previously used. The Bureau of Prisons' acting director then scheduled 5 convicted death row inmates to be executed in December 2019 and January 2020. However, on November 20, 2019, U.S. District Judge Tanya S. Chutkan issued a preliminary injunction preventing the resumption of federal executions, because the plaintiffs in the case argued that the use of pentobarbital alone violated the Federal Death Penalty Act of 1994. The injunction was upheld by the U.S. Court of Appeals for the District of Columbia Circuit and, on December 6, 2019, by the United States Supreme Court, but it told the court of appeals to rule on the case "with appropriate dispatch". Justices Alito, Gorsuch, and Kavanaugh wrote that they believed the government would ultimately win the case and that they would have set a 60-day deadline for the court of appeals to finalize it. In January 2020, the Justice Department argued to the appeals court that when Congress declared that federal executions must be carried out "in the manner prescribed by the state" where inmates were convicted, it was referring to the general method of execution allowed in states, such as lethal injection, rather than the specific drugs to be used.

In July 2020, the first federal execution under the presidency of Donald Trump was carried out, the first after a 17-year hiatus. Overall, thirteen federal prisoners were executed between July 2020 and January 2021, including the first woman executed by the federal government in 67 years.

The Boston Marathon bomber Dzhokhar Tsarnaev was sentenced to death on June 24, 2015, for his role in the terrorist attack of the 2013 Boston Marathon bombings, but that sentence was vacated by a federal appeals court on July 31, 2020. Following a Supreme Court decision, the sentence was reinstated on March 4, 2022.

It is the intention of Senator Dick Durbin and Representative Ayanna Pressley to introduce legislation in the 117th Congress to discontinue the federal death penalty. Durbin and Pressley cited wrongful convictions and racial disparities as partial justification for their effort.

Democrats introduced the Federal Death Penalty Abolition Act of 2021 on January 4, 2021. The bill is currently before the House Judiciary  Committee.

Legal process

Sentencing
In the federal system, the final decision to seek the death penalty rests with the United States Attorney General. This differs from states, where local prosecutors have the final say with no involvement from the state attorney general.

The sentence is decided by the jury and must be unanimous.

Sentences of death handed down by a jury cannot be rejected by the judge.

In case of a hung jury during the penalty phase of the trial, a life sentence is issued, even if a single juror opposed death (there is no retrial).

Appeals and clemency
While death row inmates sentenced by state governments may appeal to both state courts and federal courts, federal death row inmates have to appeal directly to federal courts.

The power of clemency and pardon belongs to the President of the United States.

Method
The method of execution of federal prisoners for offenses under the Violent Crime Control and Law Enforcement Act of 1994 is that of the state in which the conviction took place. If the state has no death penalty, the judge must select a state with the death penalty for carrying out the execution.

The federal government has a facility and regulations only for executions by lethal injection, but the United States Code allows U.S. Marshals to use state facilities and employees for federal executions.

Federal executions by lethal injection occur at the United States Penitentiary, Terre Haute.

Pre-Furman federal executions were often conducted by hanging or electrocution, and less commonly by cyanide gas.

Presidential assassins

Four Presidents of the United States were slain by assassins while in office. The assassination of Abraham Lincoln was tried by a military commission based on the military nature of the conspiracy. Charles Guiteau's trial was held in a civilian court of the District of Columbia where the assassination of James Garfield happened.

The assassin of William McKinley, Leon Czolgosz, was tried and executed for murder by New York state authorities. The accused assassin of John F. Kennedy, Lee Harvey Oswald, would presumably have been tried for murder by Texas state authorities had he not been killed two days later by Jack Ruby in the basement of the Dallas Municipal Building (then Dallas Police Department headquarters) while being transferred to the county jail. (Ruby himself was initially tried and convicted of murder in a Texas state court, but that was overturned by the Texas Court of Criminal Appeals and he died before he could be retried.) Only after Kennedy's death was it made a federal crime to murder the President of the United States.

Military executions

The United States military has executed 135 people since 1916. The most recent person to be executed by the military is U.S. Army Private John A. Bennett, executed on April 13, 1961, for child rape and attempted murder. Since the end of the Civil War in 1865, only one person has been executed for a purely military offense: Private Eddie Slovik, who was executed on January 31, 1945, after being convicted of desertion.

For offenses related to their service, members of the military are usually tried in courts-martial that apply the Uniform Code of Military Justice (UCMJ) and may order the death penalty as a possible sentence for some crimes. Military commissions may also be established in the field in time of war to expeditiously try and sentence enemy military personnel under the UCMJ for certain offenses. Controversially, the Military Commissions Act of 2009 allows military commissions to try and sentence alien unprivileged enemy belligerent[s] accused of having engaged in or purposefully and materially support[ed] hostilities against the United States or its allies, without the benefit of some UCMJ protections. In a military commission trial, the death penalty may only be imposed in case of a unanimous verdict and sentencing decision.

See also

 List of death row inmates held by the United States federal government
 Crime in the United States
 Law of the United States

References

Further reading

Texts of relevant laws

 Using a chemical weapon where the use causes death 
 Using a weapon of mass destruction where the use causes death
   Killing a member of the Congress, the Cabinet or Supreme Court, Kidnapping a member of the Congress, the Cabinet or Supreme Court resulting in death and Conspiracy to kill a member of the Congress, the Cabinet or Supreme Court resulting in death
 Using an explosive device resulting in death
 Causing death using an illegal firearm
 Genocide where death results
 Carjacking resulting in death
 Mailing explosive substances resulting in death
 Willful destruction of aircraft or motor vehicles resulting in death
 Causing death by aircraft hijacking or any attempt to commit aircraft hijacking
Causing death by kidnapping
Causing death by hostage taking
 First degree murder within the special territorial and maritime jurisdiction of the United States
 Murder by a federal prisoner already sentenced to life imprisonment 
 Murder by an escaped federal prisoner already sentenced to life imprisonment
 Murder of a court officer or juror
 Murder with the intent of preventing testimony by a witness, victim, or informant
 Retaliatory murder of a witness, victim, or informant
 Killing the President, the Vice President, or a member of the presidential staff; Kidnapping the President, the Vice President, or a member of the presidential staff resulting in death; and Conspiracy to kill the President, the Vice President, or a member of the presidential staff resulting in death  
 Killing persons aiding Federal investigations; Killing of state correctional officers by a federal inmate or during interstate transport
 Willful wrecking of a train resulting in death
 Sexual abuse resulting in death
 Sexual exploitation of children resulting in death
 Torture resulting in death
 Death resulting from violence at an international civil airport
 Murder of a U.S. national in an act of terrorism committed in another country
 Death resulting from an act of terrorism transcending national boundaries
 Death resulting from use of interstate commerce facilities in the commission or preparation of murder-for-hire
 Large-scale drug trafficking 
 Attempting, authorizing or advising the killing of any officer, juror, or witness in cases involving a Continuing Criminal Enterprise, whether such killing occurs or not 
 Crime against civil rights or conspiracy to do so, resulting in death, involving kidnapping, or involving rape:
Conspiracy against rights 
Deprivation of rights under color of law 
Federally protected activities 
Damage to religious property; obstruction of persons in the free exercise of religious beliefs
Espionage
Treason

External links
 https://www.uscourts.gov/sites/default/files/original_spencer_report.pdf

Capital punishment by the United States federal government
Capital punishment by the United States federal government
Capital punishment by the United States federal government